Government Model Higher Secondary School For Boys is a Kerala Government higher secondary school situated in Thrissur City, Kerala, India. It was started in 1836 and is the oldest school in Kerala and Thrissur District.

Notable alumni

 Tito Wilson, Actor
 Devan (actor), Actor

Notable faculty

 Mullanezhi, Poet, Lyricist, Playwright, Teacher

References

Schools in Thrissur
High schools and secondary schools in Kerala